Sky Ranger can refer to:

 The Sky Ranger (1921 film), an American 15-episode/chapter silent film serial
 The Sky Ranger (1928 film), an American silent short film
 Space Sheriff Gavan, the Japanese TV series aired in the Philippines as Sky Ranger Gabin